This article shows the rosters of all participating teams at the 2019 Asian Championship in Iran.

Pool A

The following is the Australian roster in the 2019 Asian Men's Volleyball Championship.

Head Coach: Mark Lebedew

The following is the Iranian roster in the 2019 Asian Men's Volleyball Championship.

Head Coach: Igor Kolaković

The following is the Sri Lankan roster in the 2019 Asian Men's Volleyball Championship.

Head Coach: Manuel Torres Torres Gonzalo

The following is the Qatari roster in the 2019 Asian Men's Volleyball Championship.

Head Coach: Camilo Soto

Pool B

The following is the Chinese Taipei roster in the 2019 Asian Men's Volleyball Championship.

Head Coach: Branislav Moro

The following is the Hong Kong roster in the 2019 Asian Men's Volleyball Championship.

Head Coach: Hok Chun Yau

The following is the Japanese roster in the 2019 Asian Men's Volleyball Championship.

Head Coach: Yuichi Nakagaichi

The following is the Thai roster in the 2019 Asian Men's Volleyball Championship.

Head Coach: Monchai Supajirakul

Pool C

The following is the Chinese roster in the 2019 Asian Men's Volleyball Championship.

Head Coach: Raul Lozano

The following is the Indian roster in the 2019 Asian Men's Volleyball Championship.

Head Coach: Mihailovic Dragan

The following is the Kazakhstan roster in the 2019 Asian Men's Volleyball Championship.

Head Coach: Igor Nikolchenko

The following is the Omani roster in the 2019 Asian Men's Volleyball Championship.

Head Coach: Rashid Al Maqbali

Pool D

The following is the Indonesian roster in the 2019 Asian Men's Volleyball Championship.

Head Coach: Li Qiujiang

The following is the Kuwaiti roster in the 2019 Asian Men's Volleyball Championship.

Head Coach: Mohamed Kaabar

The following is the Korean roster in the 2019 Asian Men's Volleyball Championship.

Head Coach: Im Do-heon

The following is the Pakistani roster in the 2019 Asian Men's Volleyball Championship.

Head Coach: Kim Kyoung-hoon

References

External links 
 Rosters

Asian Men's Volleyball Championship
International volleyball competitions hosted by Iran
Asian Men's Volleyball Championship
September 2019 sports events in Asia